Mart Lieder (born 1 May 1990) is a Dutch professional footballer who plays as a forward for Eredivisie club Emmen. He formerly played for Vitesse, RKC Waalwijk, FC Dordrecht, FC Aarau and FC Eindhoven.

Career
On 6 January 2020, it was confirmed that Lieder would join Odense Boldklub as a free agent on 30 June 2020. He was bought free on 28 January 2020 and joined the club immediately. On 27 January 2022 OB confirmed, that Lieder's contract had been terminated by mutual consent.

On 27 January 2022, Lieder signed with Emmen until the summer of 2023.

References

External links
 Voetbal International profile 
 

1990 births
Living people
People from Purmerend
Dutch footballers
Dutch expatriate footballers
Association football forwards
Eredivisie players
Eerste Divisie players
Swiss Challenge League players
Danish Superliga players
SBV Vitesse players
RKC Waalwijk players
FC Dordrecht players
FC Aarau players
FC Eindhoven players
SønderjyskE Fodbold players
Odense Boldklub players
FC Emmen players
Dutch expatriate sportspeople in Denmark
Dutch expatriate sportspeople in Switzerland
Expatriate men's footballers in Denmark
Expatriate footballers in Switzerland
HVV Hollandia players
Footballers from North Holland